USS Lloyd Thomas has been the name of more than one United States Navy ship, and may refer to:

 , a destroyer escort cancelled in 1944 prior to launching
 , a destroyer escort cancelled in 1944 prior to construction
 , a destroyer in commission from 1947 to 1973

United States Navy ship names